Juicy Juice is a brand of juices that targets children and sold in the United States using the slogan "100% Juice."

History

Juicy Juice was introduced by Libby's (then a subsidiary of Nestlé) in 1977. Prior to March 2006, it was known as Libby's Juicy Juice. It was then labeled under the Nestlé parent brand. In 2014, the Juicy Juice brand and business was sold by Nestlé to Harvest Hill Beverage Company, a portfolio company of Brynwood Partners.

Manufacture
Until the sale by Nestlé, Juicy Juice was manufactured in Ocean Spray production facilities, as a result of a 2002 joint agreement between Nestlé and Ocean Spray.

References

External links
 Official website
 Juicy Juice at Facebook 
 Juicy Juice at YouTube

Juice brands
Nestlé
Products introduced in 1977